Girls with guns is a subgenre of action films and animation that portray a female protagonist engaged in shootouts. The genre typically involves gun-play, stunts and martial arts action.

Cinema
The 1985 Hong Kong film Yes, Madam, directed by Corey Yuen and starring Michelle Yeoh and Cynthia Rothrock, was described by Lisa Funnel as the first "girls with guns" film. Other films of the subgenre were produced until 1994, featuring the likes of Yukari Oshima, Moon Lee, and Cynthia Khan. In the early 2000s, films part of what has been called a "girls with guns revival" cycle were produced. They included Martial Angels (2001), The Wesley's Mysterious File (2002) and So Close (2002).

Anime
The "girls-with-guns" subgenre has also permeated the anime space. Some examples include Black Lagoon, Bubblegum Crisis, Dirty Pair, Gunsmith Cats, Gunslinger Girl, Lycoris Recoil, Noir, Madlax, and El Cazador. Other examples of "girls with guns" anime are Masamune Shirow's and Mamoru Oshii's Ghost in the Shell and its television adaptation Ghost in the Shell: Stand Alone Complex as well as Yasuomi Umetsu's works Kite, Mezzo Forte, Mezzo DSA, and Kite: Liberator.

See also
 Bad girl movies
 Feminist film theory
 Femme fatale
 Heroic bloodshed
 Hong Kong action cinema
 List of female action heroes and villains

References

Action films by genre
 
Female stock characters in anime and manga
Film genres
Theatrical combat
1985 introductions
Cinema of Hong Kong